Horizons is an album by multi-instrumentalist Ira Sullivan which was recorded in 1967 and released on the Atlantic label.

Reception

The AllMusic review by Scott Yanow stated "Ira Sullivan's first recording in five years (which was originally released on Atlantic) features him switching between soprano, tenor, trumpet and flugelhorn with a quintet consisting of some obscure Florida players ... The relaxed and thought-provoking performances of tunes ranging from "Norwegian Wood" and "Everything Happens to Me" to group originals display a solid group sound and Sullivan's interest in integrating freer music and ideas into his playing".

Track listing
All compositions by Ira Sullivan except where noted
 "E Flat Tuba G" – 5:00
 "Norwegian Wood" (John Lennon, Paul McCartney ) – 5:07
 "Everything Happens to Me" (Matt Dennis, Tom Adair) – 5:43
 "Adah" (Luchi de Jesus) – 4:54
 "Horizons" (Dolphe Castellano) – 8:26
 "Oh Gee!" (Matthew Gee) – 3:17
 "Nineveh" – 8:53

Personnel
Ira Sullivan – soprano saxophone, tenor saxophone, trumpet, flugelhorn
Lon Norman – trombone, euphonium
Dolphe Castellano – piano, keyboards
William Fry– bass
Jose Cigno – drums, timpani

References

Atlantic Records albums
Ira Sullivan albums
1967 albums
Albums produced by Jerry Wexler
Albums produced by Tom Dowd